Oligarch may refer to:

Authority
 Oligarch, a member of an oligarchy, a power structure where control resides in a small number of people
 Oligarch (Kingdom of Hungary), late 13th–14th centuries
 Business oligarch, wealthy and influential businessmen 
 Russian oligarch, business oligarchs in the era of Russian privatization in the 1990s
 Ukrainian oligarchs, business oligarchs after Ukrainian independence in 1991

Other uses
 The Oligarchs, a 2001 non-fiction book by David E. Hoffman
 Oligarch planet, hypothetical planets beyond Neptune
 Old Oligarch, author of a "Constitution of the Athenians"